Baribari may refer to:

 Baribari Legend
 Baribari Value